Christopher Lynch may refer to:

 Christopher Lynch (businessman) (born 1953), Australian rules footballer and businessman
 Christopher P. Lynch (born 1963), American businessman
 Christopher Lynch (mayor), mayor of Galway
 Christopher Lynch (political scientist) (born 1963), political scientist and theorist
 Christopher B-Lynch (born 1947), obstetrician and gynaecological surgeon
 Chris Lynch (born 1962), American children's writer
 Chris Lynch (Writer) (born 1978), British writer